General elections were held in Peru on 17 June 1956 to elect the President and both houses of the Congress. Manuel Prado Ugarteche of the Pradist Democratic Movement won the presidential election with 45.5% of the vote. They were the first elections in Peru in which women could vote, and nine women were elected to Congress; Manuela Billinghurst, Alicia Blanco Montesinos, Lola Blanco Montesinos, María Colina Lozano, Matilde Pérez Palacio, Carlota Ramos de Santolaya, María Eleonora Silva Silva and Juana Ubilluz de Palacios were elected to the Chamber of Deputies, while Irene Silva de Santolalla became the first woman elected to the Senate.

Results

President

Senate

Chamber of Deputies

References

General
Elections in Peru
Peru
Presidential elections in Peru
Election and referendum articles with incomplete results